This article refers to crime in the U.S. state of Kansas.

Statistics
In 2018, there were 89,468 crimes reported in Kansas. 12,782 of these were violent offenses, including 113 murders.

Capital punishment laws

Capital punishment is applied in this state.

References